The Ox-Bow Incident is a 1943 American Western film directed by William A. Wellman, starring Henry Fonda, Dana Andrews and Mary Beth Hughes, with Anthony Quinn, William Eythe, Harry Morgan and Jane Darwell. Two cowboys arrive in a Western town, when news arrives that a local rancher has been murdered and his cattle stolen. The townspeople, joined by the two cowboys and cowboys from other ranches, form a posse to catch the perpetrators. They find three men in possession of the cattle, and are determined to see justice done on the spot.

The film premiered in May 1943 to positive reviews from critics. It was nominated for the Oscar for Best Picture at the 16th Academy Awards, losing to Casablanca. As of 2023 the film remains the only example of film receiving an Oscar nomination for Best Picture despite not being nominated in any  other Oscars category . The Ox-Bow Incident and The Outlaw (also produced in 1943) are the earliest films in the AllMovie list of psychological Westerns.

In 1998, the film was selected for preservation in the United States National Film Registry by the Library of Congress as being "culturally, historically, or aesthetically significant". The film was adapted from the 1940 novel of the same name, written by Nevadan Walter Van Tilburg Clark.

Plot
In Bridger's Wells, Nevada in 1885, Art Croft and Gil Carter ride into town and enter Darby's Saloon. The atmosphere is subdued due to recent incidents of cattle-rustling. Art and Gil are suspected to be rustlers because they have rarely been seen in town.

A man enters the saloon and announces that a rancher named Lawrence "Larry" Kinkaid has been murdered. The townspeople immediately form a posse to pursue the murderers, who they believe are cattle rustlers. A judge tells the posse that it must bring the suspects back for trial, and that its formation by a deputy (the sheriff being out of town) is illegal. Art and Gil join the posse to avoid raising even more suspicion. Davies, who was initially opposed to forming the posse, also joins, along with "Major" Tetley and his son Gerald. Poncho informs the posse that three men and cattle bearing Kinkaid's brand have just entered Bridger's Pass.

The posse encounters a stagecoach. When they try to stop it, the stagecoach guard assumes that it is a stickup, and shoots, wounding Art. In the coach are Rose Mapen, Gil's ex-girlfriend, and her new husband, Swanson.

Later that night in Ox-Bow Canyon, the posse finds three men sleeping, with what are presumed to be stolen cattle nearby. The posse interrogates them: a young, well-spoken man, Donald Martin; a Mexican, Juan Martínez; and an old man, Alva Hardwicke. Martin claims that he purchased the cattle from Kinkaid but received no bill of sale. No one believes Martin, and the posse decides to hang the three men at sunrise.

Martin writes a letter to his wife and asks Davies, the only member of the posse that he trusts, to deliver it. Davies reads the letter, and, hoping to save Martin's life, shows it to the others. Davies believes that Martin is innocent and does not deserve to die.

The Mexican "Juan" is recognized as a gambler named Francisco Morez. He tries to escape and is shot and wounded. The posse discovers that Morez has Kinkaid's gun.

Major Tetley wants the men to be lynched immediately. A vote is taken as to whether the men should be hanged or taken back to stand trial.  Only seven, among them Davies, Gerald Tetley, Gil and Art, vote to take the men back to town alive; the rest support immediate hanging. Gil tries to stop it, but is overpowered.

After the lynching, the posse heads back towards Bridger's Wells and immediately encounters Sheriff Risley, who tells them that Lawrence Kinkaid is not dead and that the men who shot him have been arrested. Risley strips the deputy of his badge and asks Davies who is responsible. “All but seven,” Davies replies, and the sheriff declares “God better have mercy on you. You won't get any from me.”

The men of the posse gather in Darby's Saloon and drink in silence. Major Tetley returns to his house, shuts out his son (who condemns his sadistic behavior), goes to his study, and closes the door, before a gunshot is heard from within. In the saloon, Gil reads Martin's letter to Art while members of the posse listen. In the letter, Martin confessed feeling sorry for the posse members, who will have to live with what they have done for the rest of their lives. In the final scene Gil and Art head out of town by the same route they rode in to deliver the letter and $500 ($ today) raised by those in the posse for Martin's wife.

Cast

Production
Director William A. Wellman loved the novel and wanted to adapt it into a film and then interested Darryl F. Zanuck in producing it. Zanuck agreed in producing the story, on the condition that Wellman would also direct two other films for the studio, Thunder Birds (1942) and Buffalo Bill (1944).

There are several differences between the film and the novel, notably the fate of the Tetleys and the fate of the lynch mob. In the book, young Gerald commits suicide by hanging himself in the barn. This leads his father to fall on his cavalry sword. The sheriff stares down each member of the mob, but then he says he will forget everything.

The role of Gil Carter, played by Henry Fonda, was originally offered to Gary Cooper, who turned it down. Fonda was generally unhappy with the quality of the films he was cast in while under contract with 20th Century Fox. This was one of only two films from that period that he was enthusiastic about acting in (the other was The Grapes of Wrath, made in 1940). Fonda regarded this film as one of his favorites.

Filming was done from late June to early August 1942, mostly in studio back-lots and sound stages; a limited amount of location shooting was done at a ranch in Chatsworth and in Lone Pine, both in California. Additional sequences and retakes were done mid-August to late August. 
The production on the film would be shut down for a week or ten days "due to the $5,000-per-film limit on new construction materials" (imposed by the War Production Board). During the shutdown, already used sets were torn down so their materials could be used to build the mountain pass set. Studio publicity noted that the Ox-Bow Valley setting was "the largest set ever constructed" by Fox, covering .

The western street set seen in this film was subsequently used in another western, The Gunfighter (1950), which starred Gregory Peck.

After filming was completed, Fonda immediately enlisted in the U.S. Navy, in which he served until 1946.

After the film was completed, it was kept on the shelf for months because Fox executives were uncertain how to market a film with such a sobering theme.

Reception
The film received mostly positive reviews. Bosley Crowther of The New York Times wrote that it "is not a picture which will brighten or cheer your day. But it is one which, for sheer, stark drama, is currently hard to beat." Variety called it a "powerful preachment against mob lynching ... Director William Wellman has skillfully guided the characters and driven home the point that hanging is unwarranted. Fonda measures up to star rating ... He helps hold together the loose ends of the rather patent plot." David Lardner of The New Yorker called it a "rather good piece of work". Harrison's Reports printed a negative review, calling it a "depressing, unpleasant, at times horrible, melodrama ... Whoever is responsible for selecting such sordid material for the screen should be awarded a 'booby' prize."
 
More recently, La Furia Umanas Toshi Fujiwara said the film is "one of the most important westerns in the history of American cinema".
Clint Eastwood has stated this is his favorite film.
However, Darryl F. Zanuck, head of Twentieth Century-Fox 1935–1956, recalled the film as 'a flop. In spite of its significance and its dramatic value, our records showed that it had failed to pay its way.  In fact, its pulling power was less than that of a Laurel and Hardy comedy we made about the same time.'

It earned $750,000 in the United States.

Awards and honors

The film was nominated for the Academy Award for Best Picture at the 16th Academy Awards, losing to Casablanca. As of 2022, it is the last film to be nominated for Best Picture and nothing else.

An outdoor mural at Twentieth Century Fox Studios, Century City, depicts the filming of The Ox-Bow Incident.

See also
 Trial movies

References 
Notes

External links
 
 
 
 
 
 
 Pictures from the movie + trailer
 The Ox-Bow Incident on Screen Guild Theater: September 18, 1944

1943 films
1943 Western (genre) films
1940s historical films
20th Century Fox films
American Western (genre) films
American black-and-white films
American historical films
American vigilante films
Films about capital punishment
Films based on American novels
Films based on Western (genre) novels
Films directed by William A. Wellman
Films scored by Cyril J. Mockridge
Films set in 1885
Films set in Nevada
Films shot in California
Films with screenplays by Lamar Trotti
Lynching in the United States
Revisionist Western (genre) films
United States National Film Registry films
1940s English-language films
1940s American films